Thomas James better known by his stage name Manikuttan or 'MK', is an Indian actor who prominently works in the Malayalam film industry. He is known for his role as Kayamkulam Kochunni in the famous TV serial of the same title broadcast by Surya TV in 2004. He was the part of the Kerala Strikers team in Celebrity Cricket League for several years. He is the title winner of Bigg Boss Malayalam Season 3 in 2021.

Early life and background
He was born to James and Eliyamma in Nalumukk a locality near Kudappanakunnu and Peroorkada in Trivandrum, Kerala, India.  He attended St. Mary's Higher Secondary School, Pattom, Trivandrum and studied B.Com at Mahatma Gandhi College, Thiruvananthapuram.

Career

Acting debut 
His acting debut was in the television series Kayamkulam Kochunni, which was aired on Surya TV.

Debut in Malayalam cinema 
His debut film was Varnachirakukal. He was the main lead in the campus film Oru Peelekanenta Oormakke taken by Mahatma College, Thiruvananthapuram in 2004. His first film appearance was in the Malayalam film Boy Friend (2005), directed by Vinayan. He acted in major movies like Mamangam (2019), Marakkar: Lion of the Arabian Sea (2021).

Big Boss Malayalam (Season 3 2021) 
In February 2021, he entered the third iteration of reality game show Bigg Boss Malayalam  hosted by Mohanlal on Asianet channel. He gained huge acceptance among viewers for his performance in the show. The show had been stopped due to the pandemic from its 96th episode, but a winner was selected through voting. On 24 July 2021, Manikkuttan was declared the winner of Bigg Boss Malayalam Season 3 at the Grand Finale conducted at EVP Film City, Chennai. He won the award for being the "Entertainer of the Season".

Filmography

All films are in Malayalam language unless otherwise noted.

Film

Television

Serials

Other television shows

References

External links
 

Indian male film actors
Indian male television actors
Living people
Male actors from Thiruvananthapuram
Male actors in Malayalam cinema
21st-century Indian male actors
Male actors in Malayalam television
Bigg Boss Malayalam contestants
Male actors in Tamil cinema
1990 births